HMS Defiance was the last wooden line-of-battle ship launched for the Royal Navy. She never saw service as a wooden line-of-battle ship. In 1884 she became a school ship.

Design 
Defiance was a development of the Renown class. Defiance was originally laid down as to the same plan as Atlas, but a new plan dated 8 October 1858 was prepared giving Defiance a lengthened bow.

Defiance was the last ship to use the midsection design that Isaac Watts created for HMS James Watt.

Career 
Her trials off Plymouth on 5 February 1862 were conducted when she was neither masted nor stored. However Defiance's lack of sea service means that there can be no certainty as to whether her design was an improvement on Atlas.

On 26 November 1884 Defiance became the Devonport torpedo and mining schoolship. Commander Frederick Hamilton was appointed in command on 1 November 1897, and re-appointed in early January 1898 after promotion to Captain. Captain James de Courcy Hamilton was appointed in command on 1 November 1900.

A special railway station to serve personnel travelling to and from the school, known as "Defiance Platform", was situated just west of Saltash railway station from 1905 until 1930.

She was sold on 26 June 1931 to Castle's Shipbreaking Yard for dismantling at Millbay, Plymouth. Doige's Annual for 1932 poignantly describes her as "the last of England's 'Wooden Walls'".

Notes 
 Some of the timbers, including 6 oak pillars, the captain's fire surround, two cross members and some decking was used in the renovation of Furzehatt House in Plymstock that was owned and occupied by the Castle family (this account was relayed to me by Major Bunny Castle (retired) who came over from NZ on holiday to see his childhood home.

References 
 Lambert, Andrew Battleships in Transition, the Creation of the Steam Battlefleet 1815-1860, Conway Maritime Press, 1984. 
 Online history HMS Defiance

External links
 The Devonport Torpedo School 
 Encyclopaedia of Plymouth History: HMS Defiance
 Photo of HMS Defiance

Battleships of the Royal Navy
Ships of the line of the Royal Navy
Ships built in Pembroke Dock
1861 ships
Victorian-era battleships of the United Kingdom